Ōsaka 7th district (大阪府第7区, Osaka-fu dai-nana-ku or simply 大阪7区, Ōsaka-nana-ku) is a single-member constituency of the House of Representatives in the national Diet of Japan. It is located in Northern central Ōsaka and covers the cities of Suita and Settsu. As of 2012, 352,998 eligible voters were registered in the district.

Before the introduction of parallel voting and single-member districts, the area had been part of the five-member Ōsaka 3rd district.

The current Representative for Ōsaka 7th district is Liberal Democrat Naomi Tokashiki (Nukaga faction) who won one of only three seats for the Liberal Democratic Party in Osaka in 2012. The previous incumbent, Osamu Fujimura, Chief Cabinet Secretary in the Noda cabinet, only ranked third – in 2012, the Democratic Party was reduced to third or even fourth party in many of Osaka's electoral districts, and nationwide seven sitting members of the Noda cabinet lost their seat in the House of Representatives. Fujimura had represented the pre-reform 3rd district for the Japan New Party since 1993 and won the new 7th district in 1996. He held onto the seat until the landslide election of 2005 when Tokashiki, then a newcomer in national politics, beat him for the first time. Fujimura regained his district seat in 2009.

List of representatives

Election results

References 

Politics of Osaka Prefecture
Districts of the House of Representatives (Japan)